Peperomia argyreia, the watermelon peperomia, is a species of flowering plant in the family Piperaceae, native to northern South America, including Bolivia, Brazil, Ecuador, and Venezuela. The plant is not closely related to either watermelons or begonias. These terms relate to the shape, markings and texture of the leaves. Tiny green flower spikes appear in summer.

The Latin specific epithet argyreia means “silvery”. 

It has gained the Royal Horticultural Society’s Award of Garden Merit.

References

External links
 The Internet Peperomia Reference

argyreia